Abrothallus parmeliarum is a species of lichenicolous fungus. It grows on the thallus and apothecia of Parmelia species. It was first described scientifically by Norwegian botanist Søren Christian Sommerfelt in 1826. In 2018, a proposal was submitted to conserve Lecidea parmeliarum against Endocarpon parasiticum so as to maintain use of the binomial Abrothallus parmeliarum.

References

parmeliarum
Fungi described in 1826
Lichenicolous fungi